In organic chemistry, an organic sulfide (British English sulphide) or thioether is an organosulfur functional group with the connectivity  as shown on right. Like many other sulfur-containing compounds, volatile sulfides have foul odors. A sulfide is similar to an ether except that it contains a sulfur atom in place of the oxygen. The grouping of oxygen and sulfur in the periodic table suggests that the chemical properties of ethers and sulfides are somewhat similar, though the extent to which this is true in practice varies depending on the application.

Nomenclature
Sulfides are sometimes called thioethers, especially in the old literature. The two organic substituents are indicated by the prefixes. (CH3)2S is called dimethylsulfide. Some sulfides are named by modifying the common name for the corresponding ether. For example, C6H5SCH3 is methyl phenyl sulfide, but is more commonly called thioanisole, since its structure is related to that for anisole, C6H5OCH3.

The modern systematic nomenclature in chemistry for the trival name thioether is sulfane.

Structure and properties
Sulfide is an angular functional group, the C–S–C angle approaching 90° The C–S bonds are about 180 pm.
For the prototype, dimethylsulfide, the C-S-C angles is 99°, which is smaller than the C-O-C angle in ether (~110°).  The C-S distance in dimethylsulfide is 1.81 Å.

Sulfides are characterized by their strong odors, which are similar to thiol odor. This odor limits the applications of volatile sulfides. In terms of their physical properties they resemble ethers, but are less volatile, higher melting, and less hydrophilic.  These properties follow from the polarizability of the divalent sulfur center, which is greater than that for oxygen in ethers.

Thiophenes
Thiophenes are a special class of sulfide-containing heterocyclic compounds. Because of their aromatic character, they are non-nucleophilic. The nonbonding electrons on sulfur are delocalized into the π-system. As a consequence, thiophene exhibits few properties expected for a sulfide – thiophene is non-nucleophilic at sulfur and, in fact, is sweet-smelling. Upon hydrogenation, thiophene gives tetrahydrothiophene, C4H8S, which indeed does behave as a typical sulfide.

Occurrence and applications
Sulfides are important in biology, notably in the amino acid methionine and the cofactor biotin. Petroleum contains many organosulfur compounds, including sulfides. Polyphenylene sulfide is a useful high temperature plastic. Coenzyme M, is the precursor to methane (i.e. natural gas) via the process of methanogenesis.

Preparation
Sulfides are typically prepared by alkylation of thiols:
R-Br + HS-R' -> R-S-R' + HBr
Such reactions are usually conducted in the presence of a base, which converts the thiol into the more nucleophilic thiolate. Analogously, the reaction of disulfides with organolithium reagents produces thioethers:
R^3 CLi + R^1 S-SR^2 -> R^3 CSR^1 + R^2 SLi
Analogous reactions are known starting with Grignard reagents.

Alternatively, sulfides can be synthesized by the addition of a thiol to an alkene in the thiol-ene reaction:
R-CH=CH2 + HS-R' -> R-CH2-CH2-S-R'
This reaction is often catalysed by free radicals produced from a photoinitiator.

Sulfides can also be prepared by many other methods, such as the Pummerer rearrangement. Trialkysulfonium salts react with nucleophiles with a dialkyl sulfide as a leaving group:
Nu- + R^3 S+ -> Nu-R + R^2 -S-R^1
This reaction is exploited in biological systems as a means of transferring an alkyl group. For example, S-adenosylmethionine acts as a methylating agent in biological SN2 reactions.

An unusual but well tested method for the synthesis of thioethers involves addition of alkenes, especially ethylene across the S-Cl bond of sulfur dichloride.  This method has been used in the production of bis(2-chloroethyl)sulfide, a mustard gas:

Reactions

Oxidation
While, in general, ethers are non-oxidizable at the oxygen, sulfides can be easily oxidized to sulfoxides, which can themselves be further oxidized to sulfones. Hydrogen peroxide is a typical oxidant. For example, dimethyl sulfide can be oxidized as follows:

OS(CH3)2 + H2O2 -> O2S(CH3)2  +  H2O

Alkylation
Ethers can be alkylated at oxygen only with difficulty, but sulfides are readily alkylated to give stable sulfonium salts, such as trimethylsulfonium iodide:
S(CH3)2 + CH3I -> [S(CH3)3]+I-

Binding to transition metals
In analogy to their easy alkylation, sulfides bind to metals to form thioether complexes. They are classified as soft ligands, but their affinity for metals is lower than typical phosphines. Chelating thioethers are known, such as 1,4,7-trithiacyclononane.

Hydrogenolysis
Sulfides undergo hydrogenolysis in the presence of certain metals:
R-S-R' + 2 H2 -> RH + R'H + H2S
Raney nickel is useful for stoichiometric reactions in organic synthesis whereas molybdenum-based catalysts are used to "sweeten" petroleum fractions, in the process called hydrodesulfurization.

References

 
Functional groups